Tulip is an unincorporated community in Highland Township, Greene County, Indiana, United States.

History
According to one source, the community was likely named for the American tulip tree. A post office was established at Tulip in 1884, and remained in operation until it was discontinued in 1906.

Geography
The Tulip Viaduct spans Richland Creek between Solsberry and Tulip.

References

External links 

Unincorporated communities in Greene County, Indiana
Unincorporated communities in Indiana
Bloomington metropolitan area, Indiana